Ballads is the second compilation album by Richard Marx. This disc features ten of Marx's ballads including one live and one previously released non-single track.

Track listing 
 "Now and Forever" (Marx) – 3:32
 "Keep Coming Back"  (Marx) – 5:26
 "Hold On to the Nights" (Marx) – 5:07
 "Silent Scream" (Marx) – 3:52
 "Angelia" (Marx) – 5:17
 "Right Here Waiting" (Marx) – 4:24
 "Hazard" (Marx) – 5:17
 "Children of the Night" (Marx) – 4:44
 "Endless Summer Nights" (Marx) – 4:27
 "Now and Forever"  (Marx) – 3:45
 "Chains Around My Heart" (Marx, Waybill) – 5:42
 "Heaven Only Knows" (Marx) – 5:35

Miscellaneous 
 There is no personal dedication on this album
 The South African release of this album, titled "Ballads (Then, Now and Forever)", features the bonus tracks "(It Looks Like) I'll Never Fall in Love" and "Can't Help Falling in Love"

Certifications

References 

1998 compilation albums
Richard Marx albums
Albums produced by Richard Marx